The 1981 Boise State Broncos football team represented Boise State University in the 1981 NCAA Division I-AA football season. The Broncos competed in the Big Sky Conference and played their home games at Bronco Stadium, an outdoor facility on campus in Boise, Idaho. The Broncos were led by sixth-year head coach Jim Criner and were the defending champions of Division I-AA.

Regular season
The Broncos finished the regular season at 9–2 and 6–1 in conference to tie for first in the Big Sky, but lost the tiebreaker due to the head-to-head loss to champion Idaho State in the conference opener. The Broncos avenged their 1980 loss Cal Poly-SLO, beating the 1980 Division II national champions 17–6 in Boise, but lost at Cal State Fullerton, whom they defeated in Boise in the previous season. The Broncos narrowly defeated rival Idaho for the fifth consecutive year, in the regular season finale in Moscow. The Vandals were winless in the Big Sky in 1981, which caused a change in head coaches. (BSU did not defeat the Vandals again until 1994, losing twelve straight).

NCAA Division I-AA playoffs
The Broncos were again invited to the NCAA Division I-AA playoffs, expanded to eight teams for 1981. As Big Sky runner-up, BSU played on the road in the quarterfinals at Jackson State, and won 19–7.  The semifinal game was played at home against top-ranked , whom the Broncos had narrowly defeated in the title game the year before. This time the Colonels prevailed 23–17, but lost the title game to Idaho State the following week in Texas.

The Broncos returned to the I-AA playoffs in 1988, the semifinals in 1990, and the title game in 1994, then moved up to Division I-A in 1996.

Notable players
Future NFL players included linebacker John Rade and safety Rick Woods. Defensive lineman Randy Trautman played four seasons in the Canadian Football League and was inducted into the College Football Hall of Fame in 1999.

Coaches
Head coach Jim Criner stayed seven seasons at Boise State before departing for Iowa State following the 1982  season. Defensive coordinator Lyle Setencich was promoted to head coach and would stay for four seasons (1983–1986).  The defensive secondary coach at BSU in 1981 was future NFL head coach John Fox.

Schedule

Roster

NFL Draft
Two Bronco seniors were selected in the 1982 NFL Draft, which lasted twelve rounds (334 selections).

References

Boise State
Boise State Broncos football seasons
Boise State Broncos football